South Dos Palos (formerly Dos Palos Station) is an unincorporated community and census-designated place (CDP) in Merced County, California, United States. The population was 1,747 at the 2020 census, up from 1,620 at the 2010 census.

Geography
It is bordered to the north by the city of Dos Palos. California State Route 33 forms the eastern edge of the community, leading north and west  to Los Banos and southeast  to Firebaugh.

History
The South Dos Palos post office opened in 1906. It is home to Koda Farms, a Japanese rice company known for its historically innovative practices.

Demographics

2010
The 2010 United States Census reported that South Dos Palos had a population of 1,620. The racial makeup of South Dos Palos was 809 (49.9%) White, 135 (8.3%) African American, 21 (1.3%) Native American, 36 (2.2%) Asian, 10 (0.6%) Pacific Islander, 552 (34.1%) from other races, and 57 (3.5%) from two or more races. Hispanic or Latino of any race were 1,262 persons (77.9%).

The Census reported that 1,620 people (100% of the population) lived in households, 0 (0%) lived in non-institutionalized group quarters, and 0 (0%) were institutionalized.

There were 426 households, out of which 257 (60.3%) had children under the age of 18 living in them, 228 (53.5%) were opposite-sex married couples living together, 106 (24.9%) had a female householder with no husband present, 36 (8.5%) had a male householder with no wife present.  There were 36 (8.5%) unmarried opposite-sex partnerships, and 2 (0.5%) same-sex married couples or partnerships. 47 households (11.0%) were made up of individuals, and 14 (3.3%) had someone living alone who was 65 years of age or older. The average household size was 3.80.  There were 370 families (86.9% of all households); the average family size was 4.02.

The population was spread out, with 601 people (37.1%) under the age of 18, 197 people (12.2%) aged 18 to 24, 403 people (24.9%) aged 25 to 44, 315 people (19.4%) aged 45 to 64, and 104 people (6.4%) who were 65 years of age or older.  The median age was 25.8 years. For every 100 females, there were 100.5 males.  For every 100 females age 18 and over, there were 99.4 males.

The homeowner vacancy rate was 3.5%; the rental vacancy rate was 10.7%.  966 people (59.6% of the population) lived in owner-occupied housing units and 654 people (40.4%) lived in rental housing units.

2000
As of the census of 2000, there were 1,385 people, 342 households, and 286 families residing in the CDP. The racial makeup of the CDP was 45.78% White, 16.03% African American, 1.95% Native American, 31.62% from other races, and 4.62% from two or more races. Hispanic or Latino of any race were 74.15% of the population.

There were 342 households, out of which 55.8% had children under the age of 18 living with them, 52.0% were married couples living together, 24.3% had a female householder with no husband present, and 16.1% were non-families. 13.2% of all households were made up of individuals, and 7.3% had someone living alone who was 65 years of age or older.  The average household size was 4.05 and the average family size was 4.41.

In the CDP, the population was spread out, with 41.7% under the age of 18, 11.9% from 18 to 24, 25.4% from 25 to 44, 14.1% from 45 to 64, and 6.9% who were 65 years of age or older.  The median age was 23 years. For every 100 females, there were 91.8 males.  For every 100 females age 18 and over, there were 90.8 males.

The median income for a household in the CDP was $18,500, and the median income for a family was $23,365. Males had a median income of $20,417 versus $12,357 for females. The per capita income for the CDP was $7,170.  About 44.6% of families and 42.2% of the population were below the poverty line, including 48.0% of those under age 18 and 14.5% of those age 65 or over.

Politics
In the state legislature South Dos Palos is located in the 12th Senate District, represented by Republican Anthony Cannella, and in the 17th Assembly District, represented by Democrat Cathleen Galgiani.

References

Census-designated places in Merced County, California
Census-designated places in California